The Award for Encouraging Disadvantaged Students into Careers in the Chemical Sciences is an American Chemical Society (ACS) award, sponsored by The Camille and Henry Dreyfus Foundation, was instituted in 1993 with the intention of recognizing "significant accomplishments by individuals in stimulating students, underrepresented in the profession, to elect careers in the chemical sciences and engineering." It is awarded by the American Chemical Society as part of their national awards program. Recipients receive $5,000, a certificate, up to $1,500 for travel expenses, and a grant of $10,000 to their designee of choice. The first recipient was Henry C. McBay.

Recipients

See also

 List of chemistry awards

References

Awards of the American Chemical Society
Awards established in 1993
Chemistry education